İnceğiz can refer to:

 Battle of İnceğiz
 Cave monastery of İnceğiz
 İnceğiz, Gazipaşa
 İnceğiz, Kale
 İnceğiz, Kazan
 İnceğiz, Kızılcahamam